Carl Neumann Degler (February 6, 1921 – December 27, 2014) was an American historian and Pulitzer Prize-winning author. He was the Margaret Byrne Professor of American History Emeritus at Stanford University.

Early life and education
Degler was born on February 6, 1921, in Newark, New Jersey. He served in the U.S. Army Air Force from 1942 to 1945. He earned a BA in history from Upsala College, and master's and doctoral degrees from Columbia University.  His 1952 PhD dissertation in political science was "Labor in the Economy and Politics of New York City, 1850–1860: A Study of the Impact of Early Industrialism."  It was never published as a whole, but several chapters became articles.

Career
Degler taught history at Vassar College for 16 years (1952–1968). In 1968 he joined the Stanford faculty and taught there for the rest of his career, retiring as Emeritus Professor in 1990. In 1986 Degler was elected President of the American Historical Association. He also served as president of the Organization of American Historians and the Southern Historical Association.

In 1972 Degler was awarded the Pulitzer Prize for History for his book Neither Black nor White (1971), a work comparing slavery and race relations in Brazil and the United States. He earlier wrote Out of Our Past (1959), a study of United States history that is currently used in high school and college classrooms and study chambers throughout the United States.

He has been described as "a scholarly champion of the common man and woman in American history" and as "a founding feminist".  He was one of only two male founding members of the National Organization for Women.

In 1973–1974 he was the Harold Vyvyan Harmsworth Professor of American History at Oxford University. He was a member of both the American Academy of Arts and Sciences and the American Philosophical Society.

Personal life
Degler was married to Catherine Grady, whom he met at Columbia, for nearly 50 years until her death. He was married to Teresa Baker Degler for the last 14 years of his life. He had two children and four grandchildren.

He died in Palo Alto, California, on December 27, 2014, at the age of 93.

Bibliography
Degler's works include:
Out of Our Past: The Forces That Shaped Modern America (1959)
Neither Black Nor White: Slavery and Race Relations in Brazil and the United States (1972)
The Other South: Southern Dissenters in the Nineteenth Century (1974)
Place Over Time: The Continuity of Southern Distinctiveness, (1977)
At Odds: Women and the Family in America from the Revolution to the Present (1981)
In Search of Human Nature: The Decline and Revival of Darwinism in American Social Thought (1991)
The Third American Revolution (1959)

References

Further reading
 Degler, Carl N. "Vassar College." in American Places, Encounters with History ed. by Willian Leuchtenburg  (2000) pp 93–103, memoir of his role as an assistant professor.
 Peterson, Barbara Bennett. "In Memoriam: Carl Degler, 1921–2014." Pacific Historical Review 84.3 (2015): 405–407.

External links
"In Pursuit of an American History" 1986 AHA Presidential Address
The Pulitzer Prizes

1921 births
2014 deaths
Writers from Newark, New Jersey
United States Army Air Forces soldiers
Historians of the United States
Presidents of the American Historical Association
Bancroft Prize winners
Pulitzer Prize for History winners
Upsala College alumni
Columbia University alumni
Stanford University Department of History faculty
Brazilianists
Historians of slavery
Harold Vyvyan Harmsworth Professors of American History
Historians from New Jersey
United States Army Air Forces personnel of World War II
Members of the American Philosophical Society
National Organization for Women people